St Joseph's Convent is a Catholic all-girls school in Chandannagar, established in 1861 by the Sisters of St. Joseph of Cluny in the Archdiocese of Calcutta. It is affiliated to the Indian Certificate of Secondary Education and Indian School Certificate examinations.

School houses 
St Joseph's Convent has four houses with their own colours and mottos as given below.

Co-curricular activities
Girl Guiding
Dramatics
Games
Dancing, Singing, Music/Band, Art & Craft
Charity Drives and Social Service
Leadership Training Services
Clubs(Nature, Quiz, Debate, karate, Computer Science, Yoga)

References

Catholic schools in India
Christian schools in West Bengal
Girls' schools in West Bengal
Schools in Hooghly district
Chandannagar
Educational institutions established in 1861
1861 establishments in British India